Abdoul Aziz Gassama (born 3 May 2003) is a French professional footballer who plays as a winger for Championnat National 3 club Châteauroux II.

Career
On 5 February 2019, Gassama signed an aspirant contract with Châteauroux. He made his senior debut with the club in a 2–1 Ligue 2 win over Troyes on 1 May 2021.

References

External links
 

2000 births
Living people
Sportspeople from Charente
French footballers
Association football wingers
LB Châteauroux players
Ligue 2 players
Championnat National 3 players
Footballers from Nouvelle-Aquitaine